Rapidan may refer to:

Minnesota
Rapidan Township, Blue Earth County, Minnesota
Rapidan, Minnesota
Rapidan Dam, a concrete gravity dam on the Blue Earth River

Virginia
Rapidan, Virginia
Rapidan Camp, President Hoover's retreat
Rapidan River
Rapidan Wildlife Management Area

Other uses
USS Rapidan (AO-18) (1919–1946), a Patoka-class replenishment oiler

See also
Rapydan, a local anesthetic combination